The Batak Christian Community Church (Gereja Punguan Kristen Batak) is a Lutheran denomination in Indonesia. It is a member of the Lutheran World Federation, which it joined in 1972. It is affiliated with the Christian Conference of Asia, the Communion of Churches in Indonesia, and the World Council of Churches.

External links 
World Council of Churches listing

Lutheran denominations
Lutheran organizations
Indonesia
Lutheran World Federation members